The siege of Geldern was one of the first military confrontations between France and Prussia during the Seven Years' War. Surrounded by an advancing French army, the Prussian garrison of Geldern surrendered after a four-month siege.

Background

In the wake of the Diplomatic Revolution of 1756 and the subsequent First Treaty of Versailles, France agreed to a defensive pact with its new ally, Austria, if either were attacked by Great Britain or Prussia.

On 29 August 1756, Prussia launched a pre-emptive invasion of the Austrian ally of Saxony, starting the Third Silesian War, and therefore drawing France into the new conflict.

The invasion led to the signing of the Second Treaty of Versailles between Austria and France on 1 May 1757. In the treaty, France promised to strengthen its commitment to their existing alliance by raising an army in Flanders to invade Prussia from the west. However, France had already been assembling troops in Flanders as early as March to invade the British ally of Hanover.

With the French invasion of Hanover looming, Frederick II of Prussia ordered for the Prussian fortress of Wesel to be evacuated in early 1757, and its garrison sent to join the assembling Hanoverian Army of Observation, leaving the garrison of Geldern on the western extremity of the Kingdom of Prussia isolated.

The garrison of Geldern exchanged fire with French hussars on 25 March, and would later fall under a full siege when the French surrounded the town on 14 April.

Siege

The Prussians attempted to flood the approaches to the fortifications, but were only partly successful. During the siege, part of the mostly-foreign Prussian garrison mutinied, although this was swiftly dealt with by von Salmuth. The garrison finally surrendered on 23 August and, in recognition of its stubborn defence, was allowed by Beausobre to withdraw to the Prussian stronghold of Magdeburg unmolested.

Aftermath
Although the siege had delayed part of the French army for several months, its conclusion allowed them to rejoin the rest of French army in the invasion of Hanover. By the time the Prussians reached Magdeburg on 4 October, almost all of the original Geldern garrison had deserted along the way.

Citations

Sources

 

Campaigns of the Seven Years' War
1757 in Europe
1757 in military history
Conflicts in 1757
Kingdom of Prussia
Hanover 1757
1757 in the Holy Roman Empire
Hanover 1757